The 1930 Tulsa Golden Hurricane football team represented the University of Tulsa during the 1930 college football season. In their sixth year under head coach Gus Henderson, the Golden Hurricane compiled a 7–2 record, won the Big Four Conference championship, and outscored their opponents by a total of 171 to 79.

Schedule

References

Tulsa
Tulsa Golden Hurricane football seasons
Tulsa Golden Hurricane football